Beni Moussa is a Moroccan tribe of Hilali-Arab descent. It is part of the Tadla confederacy.

See also 
Morocco
Tadla
Beni Hassan
Maqil
Beni Ahsen

Arab tribes in Morocco